Riad Benchadi (born November 7, 1978 in Batna) is an Algerian football player who is currently playing for MCB EL MADHER in the Ligue Régional 2 'BATNA'.

Personal
Born in Batna, Benchadi is originally from the town of Fesdis, Batna.

Honours
 Won the Algerian Championnat National twice with ES Sétif in 2007 and 2009
 Won the Arab Champions League twice with ES Sétif in 2007 and 2008
 Won the North African Cup of Champions once with ES Sétif in 2009
 Won the Algerian Cup twice with ES Sétif in 2010 and 2012
 Won the North African Super Cup once with ES Sétif in 2010
 Won the North African Cup Winners Cup once with ES Sétif in 2010
 Finalist of the CAF Confederation Cup once with ES Sétif in 2009

References

External links
 DZFoot Profile
 

1978 births
Living people
People from Batna, Algeria
Algerian footballers
Algerian Ligue Professionnelle 1 players
CA Batna players
CA Bordj Bou Arréridj players
ES Sétif players
Association football defenders
21st-century Algerian people